The 1962 Utah Redskins football team was an American football team that represented the University of Utah as a member of the newly-formed Western Athletic Conference (WAC) during the 1962 NCAA University Division football season. In their fifth season under head coach Ray Nagel, the Redskins compiled an overall record of 4–5–1 with a mark of 1–2–1 against conference opponents, placing last out of six teams in the WAC. Home games were played on campus at Ute Stadium in Salt Lake City.

Schedule

Roster

References

External links
 Sports Reference - 1962 Utah Utes football season
 Official game program: Idaho at Utah – October 27, 1962

Utah
Utah Utes football seasons
Utah Redskins football